Charles Hamilton Wood (born 5 October 2002) is an English professional footballer who plays for Stocksbridge Park Steels, on loan from Bradford City, as a forward.

Career
Wood began his career with Bradford City, captaining their youth team.

He made his senior debut for Bradford City on 10 November 2020, alongside fellow youth team player Olivier Sukiennicki, appearing as an 80th minute substitute in the EFL Trophy in a 3–1 home defeat against Oldham Athletic. Two days later he was named in the League Football Education's 'The 11' list for November 2020, which recognises both football and non-footballing activities of young players.

In May 2021 he won the 2020–21 Academy Player of the Year award at Bradford City's end-of-season awards.

On 17 June 2021 Wood signed a one-year professional contract with Bradford City. He moved on loan to Ossett United in December 2021, scoring on his debut. The loan was extended in January 2022 until the end of the season.

He was one of seven players offered a new contract by Bradford City at the end of the 2021–22 season. He signed a new one-year contract with the club in June 2022.

In July 2022 he moved on loan to Guiseley. The loan ended in January 2023, after 13 appearances in all competitions for the club. In February 2023 he moved on loan to Stocksbridge Park Steels.

References

2002 births
Living people
English footballers
Bradford City A.F.C. players
Ossett United F.C. players
Guiseley A.F.C. players
Stocksbridge Park Steels F.C. players
Northern Premier League players
Association football forwards